Jurek Wajdowicz (born April 26, 1951, Cracow) is a Polish-born American artist, graphic designer, fine art contemporary photographer and art director. He lives and works in New York City.

Wajdowicz concentrates on images of poverty, famine, social inequality and violence in his typographic designs to more tranquil contemplative images in his art photography. From 2009, Wajdowicz has focused on fine art abstract photography resulting in several ongoing thematic series. His book, Liminal Spaces was published in 2013. Some of his recent work was represented at the Kasia Michalski Gallery in Warsaw, Poland 2015, the Vienna contemporary art fair in Vienna, Austria 2015, Nailya Alexander Gallery in New York in 2016, and Book Art Museum in Lodz, Poland 2018. Wajdowicz was selected as one of the "Most Influential Graphic Designers of the Past 50 Years" in the 50th Anniversary Survey of Graphic Design: USA magazine.

Life and career
Wajdowicz began his career as an artist in Lodz, Poland, where he graduated summa cum laude with a master's degree in graphic design from the Lodz Academy of Fine Arts. After working on design projects for theaters and museums in Lodz, Warsaw and England (Pentagram, London), he went to the United States as an art director at Lubalin, Burns & Company in New York before co-founding Emerson, Wajdowicz Studios (EWS) with Lisa LaRochelle in 1982. EWS' partners and clients include international humanitarian organizations and non-profit institutions active in social change. From the 1990s to the present Wajdowicz and EWS created projects for the Rockefeller Foundation, Domtar, Doctors Without Borders (MSF), the Arcus Foundation, International Rescue Committee, Magnum Photos, Freedom House and the United Nations, working with photographers such as Eugene Richards, Sebastião Salgado, Steve McCurry, Antonin Kratochvil, Deborah Turbeville, Philip Jones Griffiths, Richard Avedon, Elliott Erwitt, Jonas Bendiksen, James Nachtwey, Alex Webb and Gueorgui Pinkhassov. From 2013 Jurek Wajdowicz became the art director, curator and also a contributing photographer of the international LGBT-themed, photography books, a concept co-created by Jon Stryker and Wajdowicz. The ongoing series is published by The New Press including photojournalists Kike Arnal, Misha Friedman, Sunil Gupta, Maciek Nabrdalik, Jenny Papalexandris and Charan Singh.

Publications

Publications by Wajdowicz
Emerson, Wajdowicz Studios: Graphic Design. EWS/HMP, 1998. 
Liminal Spaces: Fotografie_75. Lars Müller, 2013. With introductions by Fred Ritchin and Jennifer Sterling. 
Pride & Joy: Taking the Streets of New York City. The New Press, 2016. With introductions by Kate Clinton and Jon Stryker. 
67/11. EWS Press, 2017.

Publications with contributions by Wajdowicz
 Endure – Renewal from ground zero. Jurek Wajdowicz with Antonín Kratochvíl, Gilles Peress, Carolina Salguero, Larry Towell and Alex Webb. Rockefeller Foundation, 2001. .
 Political / Social Posters. Jurek Wajdowicz with Andrea Castelletti, John Clark, Milton Glaser, Mark Gowing, Toshiaki Ide, Uwe Loesch, Joao Machado, Pentagram Design and Francois Robert.  Edited by B Martin Pedersen, Graphis. 2015. .
 Robin Landa. Graphic Design Solutions. Boston: Wadsworth Publishing. 
 Misha Friedman. Lyudmila and Natasha. New York: The New Press, 2015. 
 Kike Arnal. Bordered Lives. New York: The New Press, 2015. 
 David Brier. Great Type and Lettering Designs. North Light Books. 
 Jenny Papalexandris. Five Bells. New York: The New Press, 2016. .
 Sunil Gupta and Charan Singh. Delhi: Communities of Belonging. The New Press, 2016. .
 Michel Delsol. Edges of the Rainbow. The New Press, 2017. 
 Gabriela Herman. The Kids: The Children of LGBTQ Parents in the USA. The New Press, 2017.   
 Maciek Nabrdalik. OUT: LGBTQ Poland. The New Press, 2018.   
 Kike Arnal. Revealing Selves. The New Press, 2018. 
 Slobodan Randjelović. Lives in Transition. The New Press, 2018. 
Claudia Jares. Dark Tears. The New Press, 2019. 
Jake Naughton & Jacob Kushner. This Is How the Heart Beats. The New Press, 2020.

Collections
Wajdowicz's art photography and design work is held in the following permanent collections:
United States Library of Congress (USA).
National 9/11 Memorial & Museum (USA).
United Nations Headquarters (Geneva and New York).
Rockefeller Foundation (New York).
The Poster Museum in Wilanow (Poland).
The Musée des Arts Décoratifs (Switzerland).
American Institute of Graphic Arts (New York).
Museum of Modern Art in Lodz (Poland).
Arcus Foundation (New York). 
Museum für Kunst und Gewerbe (Hamburg).
Collection of the Center for the Study of Political Graphics (Culver City, USA)
Book Art Museum in Lodz (Poland)

References

External links
Jurek Wajdowicz's official fine art photography website
Emerson Wajdowicz Studios (EWS) design website
Kasia Michalski Gallery 2015 Jurek Wajdowicz Solace Exhibition Interview (in English and Polish)
Liminal Spaces. Fotografie_75. Jurek Wajdowicz. Lars Müller Publishers
Pride & Joy. Taking the Streets of New York City. The New Press
Primary Forces Exhibition 2016. Jurek Wajdowicz @ Nailya Alexander Gallery Jurek Wajdowicz - Artists - Nailya Alexander Gallery
Diverse Humanity Photo Books Series About | Diverse Humanity
67/11. Jurek Wajdowicz. 2017. EWS Press “67/11” by Jurek Wajdowicz. Book trailer.
Book Art Museum 2018. Swiatla i Swiaty / Luminescence Exhibition „Światła i Światy” - Jurek Wajdowicz i Ewa Latkowska-Żychska

1951 births
Living people
American graphic designers
Artists from New York City
Polish emigrants to the United States
Artists from Łódź
American art directors
American contemporary artists
Fine art photographers